Fort Convent School/Convent School was founded in 1855 by the Convent of Jesus and Mary in Fort, Mumbai, India.

The school is open to all castes and creeds. Besides academics, the school conducts co-curricular activities such as public speaking/recitation/debates and enrichment camps. Interact of Rotary International exposes students to social services. The school celebrates significant days and festivals.

Fort Convent is a contributory school for Bombay Teacher's Training College. The college maintains linkages with schools in Mumbai, where Practice Teaching is conducted.

The Sisters participate in the pastoral activities of the Parish.

Notable alumni 
 Sana Saeed, actress and model
Juhi Chawla, actress and Femina India Miss Universe 1984
 Lymaraina D'Souza, model and Femina India Miss Universe 1998
 Kitu Gidwani, designer, model, actress
 Priyadarshini Raje Scindia Verve's "Best dressed - 2008"; 2012 Femina:"India's 50 Most Beautiful Woman"
 Barkha Singh, actress and model

See also 
 List of schools in Mumbai
List of the oldest schools in the world

References

External links 
 
New Interact Team takes Over and gets going at Fort Convent
Bombay teacher's Training College Partnership.

Private schools in Mumbai
Girls' schools in Maharashtra
Educational institutions established in 1855
1855 establishments in India
Schools in Colonial India